Jaanus Marrandi (born 23 March 1963, Paide) is an Estonian politician who belongs to Social Democratic Party.

He has been the member of IX, X, XI, XIII Riigikogu.

In 2002-2003 he was agricultural minister of Estonia.

References

1963 births
Living people
Social Democratic Party (Estonia) politicians
Members of the Riigikogu, 1999–2003
Members of the Riigikogu, 2003–2007
Members of the Riigikogu, 2007–2011
Members of the Riigikogu, 2015–2019
20th-century Estonian politicians
21st-century Estonian politicians
People from Paide